"Education Nation" is NBC News' initiative to engage citizens in a solutions-focused conversation about the state of education in the United States. The initiative was launched in the fall of 2010 and continues to be a key feature of the news division through local events and on-air programming across the network's shows and platforms throughout the year.

Education Nation 2013

Fall 2013 saw Education Nation reach its fourth year. This year continued NBC News' sustained focus on highlighting education news and content across platforms. The initiative culminated in the Education Nation summit, which was held October 6th through 8th at the New York Public Library. The 2013 summit theme, "What It Takes," examined the state of education in the United States, with a specific focus on preparing students for future education and employment opportunities.

The Education Nation summit consisted of a series of workshops, panels, and town hall meetings exploring such themes as the Common Core State Standards Initiative, personalized learning, and keeping up with global competition. Notable speakers and presenters included Governor Steve Beshear of Kentucky, Governor Mike Pence of Indiana, Governor Deval Patrick of Massachusetts, Chairman and CEO of ExxonMobil Rex Tillerson,  Chancellor of the New York City Department of Education Dennis Walcott, and New York City Mayor Michael Bloomberg. This year's summit also featured an Innovation Challenge for education technology startups, sponsored by the Robin Hood Foundation, which was won by San Francisco-based CodeHS.

Education Nation 2012

Heading into its third year, the “Education Nation” initiative employed all platforms of NBC News  --including MSNBC, programs like “NBC Nightly News,” “Today,” “Rock Center,” and “Meet the Press,” digital properties such as msnbc.com and EducationNation.com, and live events across the country -- in a continued effort to shine a spotlight on the challenges, potential solutions and innovations spanning today's education landscape. In 2012, “Education Nation” deepened public engagement in a solutions-focused discussion on improving student achievement and preparedness for the workforce, giving special attention to innovation and technology.

The centerpiece of “Education Nation” 2012 was the national summit in New York City from September 23rd - 25th. The event was held in a new venue. In addition to the summit, the network also continued “Education Nation On-The-Road” in the spring of 2012. Making stops in Denver, Atlanta and Miami in April and May, the NBC News team hosted a series of panels and events involving NBC News anchors and correspondents, local leaders, officials, educators, parents, and students.

Education Nation 2011

In 2011, “Education Nation” launched its first on-the-road tour, hosting a series of panels and events focused on local education issues in Chicago, Los Angeles and Philadelphia.

In September, NBC News hosted its second-annual “Education Nation” Summit on Rockefeller Plaza from Sunday, September 25th through Tuesday, September 27th, 2011. In addition to the events, NBC News also constructed the "Education Nation Experience"—a state-of-the-art public exhibit where visitors could engage with videos and interactive tools to explore the skills, knowledge and training required to succeed in the 21st century.

Sunday's events included a national Teacher Town Hall with hundreds of teachers from across the country and thousands more online at EducationNation.com, and the world premiere of American Teacher—a documentary film narrated by Matt Damon.

Monday and Tuesday featured back-to-back panel discussions hosted by NBC News talent like Tom Brokaw, Brian Williams, and Ann Curry with contributions from U.S. Secretary of Education Arne Duncan, Warren Buffett, Melinda Gates, and numerous civic leaders including ten governors from across the U.S. and former President Bill Clinton.

References

External links
NBC News Education Nation 
American Teacher at IMDb 

NBC News
Education in the United States